Republican Spartak Stadium is a multi-purpose stadium in Vladikavkaz, Russia. It is currently used mostly for football matches. The stadium was built in 1962 and is able to hold 32,464 people. It is the home ground for FC Spartak Vladikavkaz.

Buildings and structures in North Ossetia–Alania
Football venues in Russia
Multi-purpose stadiums in Russia
FC Spartak Vladikavkaz
Sport in Vladikavkaz